The Stu Davis Show was a Canadian country music television series which aired on CBC Television in 1966.

Premise
Stu Davis (Red River Jamboree, Swing Your Partner, Rope Around the Sun) hosted this Edmonton-produced series with his son, Duane Davis. Series regulars included the band The Pathfinders.

Scheduling
Produced locally in Edmonton, Alberta for four seasons, this 15-minute series was picked up nationally on the CBC network Saturdays at 6:30 p.m. (Eastern) from 2 April to 25 June 1966.

References

External links
 

1966 Canadian television series debuts
1966 Canadian television series endings
CBC Television original programming
Country music television series
Television shows filmed in Edmonton
1960s Canadian music television series